Insomnia: The Best of Faithless is a greatest hits two-disc compilation album from the dance music group Faithless.

Track listing

Charts

References

External links
 

2009 compilation albums
Faithless albums
Albums produced by Rollo Armstrong